Andriy Andriyovych Govorov (born 10 April 1992) is a Ukrainian competitive swimmer who holds the world record, European champion (2016 London) and bronze medalist in world championship (2017 Budapest) in 50 meters butterfly.

Personal life
Govorov was born on 10 April 1992 in Sevastopol, Ukraine. A graduate of the Dnipro Higher School of Physical Culture, in 2016 he also attended the Dnipro National University.

Career

International Swimming League 
In spring 2020, Govorov signed to the Toronto Titans, in their inaugural season.

European Championships 

Govorov won a silver medal at the 50 meter butterfly and a bronze medal at the 50 meter freestyle during the 2010 European Short Course Swimming Championships. During the 2010 FINA Short Course World Championships he again won a silver medal at the 50 meter butterfly.

Between 2011 and 2015, he won three gold medals in the 50 m butterfly at the European Short Course Swimming Championships.

Following the 2014 Russian annexation of his native Crimea Govorov ruled out changing his nationality and continues to compete for Ukraine.

At the 2016 European Aquatics Championships in London, he won the gold medal in the 50 m butterfly (long course). In the semifinals he swam a time of 22.73, which broke his own national and championship records. It was also the fastest time ever swum in a textile swimsuit.

At the 2018 European Championships in Glasgow, Govorov won gold in the 50 metre butterfly, in a championship record time of 22.48.

Other 
On July 1, 2018, Govorov broke the long course world record in the 50m butterfly, held for 9 years by Spain's Rafael Muñoz, in a time of 22.27, beating the 2017 world champion in the same event Ben Proud (22.93) and the Dutchman Mathys Goosen (23.55) at the Trofeo Sette Colli held in Rome, Italy.

References

External links
 
 
 About Hovorov at the Ministry of Youth and Sports of Ukraine (10 April 2016)

 

1992 births
Living people
Sportspeople from Sevastopol
Ukrainian male butterfly swimmers
Swimmers at the 2010 Summer Youth Olympics
Swimmers at the 2012 Summer Olympics
Swimmers at the 2016 Summer Olympics
Olympic swimmers of Ukraine
Medalists at the FINA World Swimming Championships (25 m)
European Aquatics Championships medalists in swimming
Oles Honchar Dnipro National University alumni
World Aquatics Championships medalists in swimming
World record holders in swimming
Ukrainian male freestyle swimmers
Universiade medalists in swimming
Universiade gold medalists for Ukraine
Medalists at the 2017 Summer Universiade
Youth Olympic gold medalists for Ukraine
21st-century Ukrainian people